The Tinkisso River is a river in Guinea in west Africa. The river is sourced near Dalaba in the Fouta Djallon mountain range, north of Mamou and snakes approximately north-east and then east across the plains of Guinea, until it runs into the River Niger at Siguiri.

The river and the surrounding plains were designated a Ramsar site by the Niger Basin Authority and the Guinean government in 2002. The river and its tributaries are the home to species of manatee.

References

Press release from the Ramsar Convention Bureau on the new wetland designation.

Rivers of Guinea
Tributaries of the Niger River
Ramsar sites in Guinea